Patriotic Unity (INITE), is a political party in Haiti founded on 28 November 2009. Its dissolution had been claimed by former leading members on 30 April 2019 but was then disputed by the current leadership. Its founder and leader was René Préval, who served as President of Haiti from 2006 to 2011.

History
The party was created simply as Inite on 28 November 2009 as a successor of Lespwa, a political platform created by René Préval during his presidential candidacy in 2006. In November 2009 Lespwa was dissolved and merged into the new party, which included some factions from the National Christian Union for the Reconstruction of Haiti (Union Nationale Chrétienne pour la Reconstruction d'Haïti), the Movement for National Reconstruction (Mouvement pour la Reconstruction Nationale), the Country Organization Movement (Mouvement d'Organisation du Pays), and the Open the Gate Party (Parti Louvri Barye).

In the 2010 elections Jude Célestin was its presidential candidate, finishing second but he did not advance to the second round because of allegations made to the Provisional Electoral Council. In the parliamentary election, it gained 35 seats in the Chamber of Deputies and 11 in the Senate.

The party was renamed in April 2015 as Patriotic Unity (Inite Patriyotik), after the merger with two other political groups. At almost the same time, René Préval and his supporters founded Truth (Vérité in French), a new political party. Both parties competed in the 2015 parliamentary elections in separate ways. Inite Patriyotik presented 8 candidates for the Senate and 39 for the Chamber of Deputies.

It was reported in late-April 2019 that the party's founding members had decided to dissolve it on 12 April. However, the spokesperson for its national coordination committee, Sorel Jacinthe, denied on 6 May that the party had been dissolved and blamed Paul Denis of spreading rumours about its dissolution to strengthen the new party he was creating. Denis however denied the accusation. On 10 May, Denis and several other dissident members of Inite announced the launching of the Inifos party.

On 14 May 2019, members of Inite's national coordination committee stated that the party still existed and the founding members had no right to dissolve it without discussing the issue with the elected members of the party per the party constitution. The Justice Minister Jean Roudy Aly responded to the committee's protests against the announced dissolution, saying he took note of them, and the situation remains unchanged.

In October 2020, Inite along with eight other opposition parties formed a coalition to make President Jovenel Moïse resign. After the assassination of Moïse, it was one of the political parties that signed an agreement on 9 July 2021 declaring Joseph Lambert as the interim President. It and other political parties signed an agreement with Prime Minister Ariel Henry on 11 September, for a peaceful and consensual administration of the country before the swearing-in of an elected government.

References

2009 establishments in Haiti
Political parties established in 2009
Political parties in Haiti